Muñecos de Papel was a fictional Mexican pop group that appeared on the 1991 telenovela, Alcanzar Una Estrella II. Its members were Sasha Sokol, at the time a former member from real life pop group Timbiriche, that also "shared" members Bibi Gaytán and Erik Rubin. The group was also formed by Ricky Martin (post-Menudo), soloist singer Pedro Fernández, soprano singer Marisa de Lille and the actress Angélica Rivera, the latter whom later became the First Lady of Mexico.

They recorded 2 albums for 2 different music labels.  The first one for Sony Music, titled Muñecos de Papel, included: Siento performed by Sasha Sokol,  Juego de Ajedrez performed by Ricky Martin, Para Llegar performed by Angélica Rivera, Oro performed by Pedro Fernández, and the famous track performed by the group, Muñecos de Papel, among others.  The second album was recorded for Melody Music, titled Alcanzar Una Estrella II, included: Tan Solo Una Mujer performed by Bibi Gaytán, Hacia El Viento performed by Erik Rubin, Rebeldía performed by Marisa de Lille and the famous track performed by the group, No Quiero Dejar De Brillar, among others.

They had a national tour visiting many cities in Mexico.  The Creative Producer and director of the Concept was Luis de Llano Macedo, former creative producer and director of such vocal groups as: Timbiriche, Kabah (band) and Micro Chips.  This group, and the 1991 telenovela they starred in, could be the prototype of the now famous 2004 telenovela, Rebelde and the RBD phenomenon.

Timbiriche
Mexican musical groups
Fictional musical groups